The Northern Virginia Chamber of Commerce is a membership based business network located in Fairfax County, Virginia.  It represents 650+ businesses and 500,000 employees, making it the largest regional chamber of commerce in Virginia.

The chamber provides the Northern Virginia business community with access to opportunities represented by the Chamber’s four foundational pillars: business development, thought leadership, strategic advocacy,  and community partnerships.

In January 2016, the organization restructured itself from the Fairfax Chamber of Commerce to the Northern Virginia Chamber of Commerce. In August 2018, the Chamber announced that Better Business Bureau Chief Operating Officer, Julie Coons, would be the organization's new President and CEO following a nation-wide search.

Mission statement
The Northern Virginia Chamber offers business development opportunities to organizations interested in growth through knowledge, access and influence in Northern Virginia, the Commonwealth of Virginia, and the Metropolitan Washington Region. The Chamber leads the business community by: engaging in thought leadership; strengthening industry knowledge; advocating for business positions; and supporting key partnerships.

Board of directors
Julie Coons, President and CEO
Todd Rowley, Chair
Kathryn Falk, Vice Chair
Luanne Gutermuth, Secretary
Susan Moser, Treasurer
Scott Hommer, General Counsel
Jennifer Siciliano, Immediate Past Chair

References

External links
 Office website

Chambers of commerce in the United States
Companies based in Fairfax County, Virginia
Organizations established in 1925
1925 establishments in Virginia